Yury Vyarheychyk (born 5 March 1968) is a Belarusian professional football coach and a former player. 
He is the father of Kiryl Vyarheychyk.

Honours

Player career
Dinamo-93 Minsk
Belarusian Cup winner: 1994–95

Coach career
Shakhtyor Soligorsk
Belarusian Premier League champion: 2005
Belarusian Cup winner: 2003–04

External links
 

1968 births
Living people
Soviet footballers
Belarusian footballers
Belarus international footballers
Belarusian football managers
Belarusian Premier League players
FC Dinamo Minsk players
R.W.D. Molenbeek players
Rot Weiss Ahlen players
FC Shakhtyor Soligorsk players
FC Dinamo-93 Minsk players
Belarusian expatriate footballers
Expatriate footballers in Germany
Expatriate footballers in Belgium
FC Shakhtyor Soligorsk managers
Association football forwards
Footballers from Minsk